Küçük Menderes ("Little Meander"), Cayster River or Kaystros River (French: Caÿstre) or Caystrus River is a river south of İzmir, Turkey. It generally flows westward and arrives at the Aegean Sea at Pamucak beach, near Selçuk, İzmir.

The ancient city of Ephesus was once an important port on the river, but over the centuries, sedimentation gradually filled in the inlet around the city. The ancient port of Panormus was near its mouth.

Its tributaries are the Fertek, Uladı, Ilıca, Değirmen, Aktaş, Rahmanlar, Prinçci, Yuvalı, Ceriközkayası, Eğridere, Birgi, Çevlik and Keles.

The river is currently just north of the Büyük Menderes ("Big Meander") River; both rivers have often changed their course.

References

Rivers of Turkey
Landforms of İzmir Province